is a subway station on the Sendai Subway Tōzai Line in Taihaku-ku, Sendai, Japan, operated by the municipal subway operator Sendai City Transportation Bureau. It is located near and named for the Sendai Yagiyama Zoological Park.

Lines
Yagiyama Zoological Park Station is served by the  Sendai Subway Tōzai Line, and forms the western terminus of the line. The station is numbered "T01".

Station layout
The station has one island platform serving two tracks on the third basement ("B3F") level. The ticket barriers are located on the second basement ("B2F") level.

Platforms

Gallery

History
The station opened on 6 December 2015, coinciding with the opening of the Tōzai Line.

Passenger statistics
In fiscal 2015, the station was used by an average of 4,451 passengers daily.

Surrounding area
 
 Yagiyama Benyland amusement park
 Tohoku Institute of Technology Yagiyama Campus
 Sendai Johnan High School
 Research Institute for Electromagnetic Materials

See also
 List of railway stations in Japan

References

External links

  

Sendai Subway Tozai Line
Railway stations in Sendai
Railway stations in Japan opened in 2015